The Camp Salmen House is located on the shores of Bayou Liberty in St. Tammany Parish, west of Slidell, Louisiana, USA.  It is a French Creole cottage, circa 1830. The house was built with a brick core, wood frame post rooms, a cabinet/loggia, and front gallery.
The entire structure, including the front gallery, is approximately 1,692 square feet.  The house was placed on the National Register of Historic Places on April 24, 2006.  It is one of only fourteen examples of the period French Creole architecture in the parish.  The National Register of Historic Places listings in St. Tammany Parish, Louisiana lists 38 historic places in St. Tammany Parish.

The exact year of the house's construction is under research, with 1750 being the earliest given date and 1830 the latest.  Data shows that the Francois Cousin House, located across Bayou Liberty in the area of the Salmen House, was built between 1787 and 1790 indicating settlement in the area at that time. While the style of house construction favors that of a family home, many believe that the building served as a trading post.

The Salmen House is located in the  Camp Salmen Nature Park, scheduled to open in 2010.  The house became the main lodge for the New Orleans area Boy Scouts, giving it the name of Camp Salmen Lodge.  The restoration of Camp Salmen House (or Camp Salmen Lodge) will begin after the opening of the nature park.

Photographs

References

External links
 National Register Information, State of Louisiana, Camp Salmen House

Creole architecture in Louisiana
Houses on the National Register of Historic Places in Louisiana
Houses completed in 1830
Houses in St. Tammany Parish, Louisiana
1830 establishments in Louisiana
National Register of Historic Places in St. Tammany Parish, Louisiana